Achyra takowensis is a moth in the family Crambidae. It was described by Koen V. N. Maes in 1987. It is endemic to Taiwan.

References

Moths described in 1987
Moths of Taiwan
Pyraustinae